List of accidents and incidents involving the Avro Lincoln four-engined heavy-bomber and later used for signals intelligence, radar research and as an-engine test bed.

1940s
1946
20 February 1946 RF385 of No. 57 Squadron RAF lost control in cloud and crashed near Barsby, Leicestershire, seven killed.
28 August 1946 RF441 of No. 61 Squadron RAF landing gear collapses while taxying at RAF Waddington.
29 August 1946 RF485 of No. 97 Squadron RAF caught fire in a hangar at RAF Coningsby.
8 November 1946 RE285 of the Air Torpedo Development Unit was abandoned over Chirton, Wiltshire at night when the fuel was exhausted.
1947
24 February 1947 RF479 of No. 57 Squadron RAF hit snowbank on take-off. The landing gear collapsed on landing at RAF Woodbridge.
23 May 1947 RE365 of No. 61 Squadron RAF crashed on approach to RAF Waddington, two killed.
24 September 1947 RE373 of No. 97 Squadron RAF dived into the ground near Caistor, Norfolk, nine killed.
21 October 1947 RF467 of No. 83 Squadron RAF landing gear collapsed on landing at RAF Hemswell.
1948
26 January 1948 RE364 of the Empire Air Navigation School caught fire while being refuelled at RAF Shawbury, not repaired.
30 April 1948 RF474 of No. 9 Squadron RAF broke up in cloud and crashed near Istres, France, 11 killed.
2 July 1948 RF560 of the Aeroplane and Armament Experimental Establishment (A&AEE) spun into the ground near RAF Boscombe Down, four killed.
9 July 1948 RF518 of No. 61 Squadron RAF stalled on landing when pilot's seat collapsed at RAF Wittering.
31 August 1948 RF419 of No. 44 Squadron RAF flew into the ground while overshooting at RAF Wyton.
19 October 1948 RF475 of No. 100 Squadron RAF landing gear collapsed on take-off from RAF Hemswell.
10 November 1948 RF440 of No. 138 Squadron RAF crashed during an overshoot at Shallufa, Egypt and destroyed by fire.
10 November 1948 SX924 of WEE RCAF ditched into Watson Lake, Yukon, after experiencing fuel flow problems.
1949
3 February 1949 RE338 of No. 230 Operational Conversion Unit RAF had the landing gear collapse on landing at RAF Lindholme.
1 April 1949 RF359 of No. 61 Squadron RAF had the landing gear collapse on landing at Merignac, France.
7 April 1949 RE370 of No. 61 Squadron RAF had the landing gear collapse on landing at Shallufa, Egypt.
15 July 1949 RF471 of No. 61 Squadron RAF crashed  from RAF Waddington, reason unknown, seven killed.
26 September 1949 RE374 of No. 57 Squadron RAF and RF407 of No. 61 Squadron RAF collide and crash over Shropshire, seven on each aircraft killed.
1 November 1949 RF469 of No. 57 Squadron RAF swung on take-off at Shallufa, Egypt and the landing gear collapsed.
24 November 1949 RF470 of No. 57 Squadron RAF swung on overshoot at RAF Waddington.

1950s
1950
15 March 1950 RF472 of No. 100 Squadron RAF overshot on landing at night at RAF Hemswell and crashed, five killed.
15 March 1950 RF511 of No. 230 Operational Conversion Unit RAF flew into a mountain near Bethesda, Caernarvon, Wales, six killed.
14 April 1950 RE232 of the Aeroplane and Armament Experimental Establishment had the landing gear collapse on take-off at Silloth.
20 April 1950 RF408 of No. 230 Operational Conversion Unit RAF landed with wheels-up during an overshoot at RAF Scampton.
11 May 1950 SX957 of No. 148 Squadron RAF collided with a de Havilland Vampire (VZ188) during a dummy attack  East-North-East of Fayid, Egypt, ten killed in Lincoln and one in Vampire.
27 June 1950 RF383 of No. 100 Squadron RAF was hit by RF498 while parked at RAF Tengah and damaged beyond repair.
12 December 1950 RE344 of No. 12 Squadron RAF crashed on landing at RAF Binbrook.
1951
18 January 1951 RA712 of No. 617 Squadron RAF undershot on landing at RAF Binbrook and hit two parked Lincolns, RF537 and SX958, one killed.
22 January 1951RA717 of No. 230 Operational Conversion Unit RAF flew into ground  North-East of RAF Scampton during a beam approach.
5 February 1951 SX981 of No. 101 Squadron RAF was abandoned near Driffield following an engine fire.
24 April 1951 RA682 of No. 230 Operational Conversion Unit RAF swung on landing at RAF Scampton and landing gear collapsed.
14 July 1951 RA692 of No. 230 Operational Conversion Unit RAF flew into the ground  East-North-East of RAF Scampton during a night approach, seven killed.
24 August 1951 RA679 of No. 12 Squadron RAF overshot on landing at RAF Binbrook and landing gear collapsed.
22 September 1951 RE302 of the Royal Air Force Technical College had the landing gear collapse on landing at RAF Marham.
26 September 1951 RA689 of No. 9 Squadron RAF had a collapsed landing gear on landing as Shallufa, Egypt.
10 October 1951 RE342 of No. 7 Squadron RAF flew into the ground on approach to RAF Upwood.
17 November 1951 RF337 of the Central Signals Establishment had engine failure on take-off at RAF Gibraltar and flew into the sea.
20 November 1951 RF353 of No. 230 Operational Conversion Unit RAF had the landing gear collapse on landing at RAF Scampton.
26 November 1951 RF500 of the Central Gunnery School crashed on approach to RAF Leconfield, two killed.
26 November 1951 SX939 of No. 100 Squadron RAF was overstressed and relegated to ground training duties.
1 December 1951 RF567 of No. 230 Operational Conversion Unit RAF hit a hangar at RAF Scampton during an overshoot, two killed.
20 December 1951 SX991 of the Radar Research Flight flew into the ground on approach to RAF Benson.
1952
22 January 1952 RE413 of No. 97 Squadron RAF crashed on approach to RAF Marham, Norfolk.
25 February 1952 SX928 of No. 230 Operational Conversion Unit RAF crashed near RAF Scampton after an overshoot in fog.
23 December 1952 RE424 of No. 61 Squadron RAF crashed at Westfield Farm, Lincolnshire on approach to RAF Waddington.
19 December 1952 RF453 of No. 7 Squadron RAF was damaged beyond repair after it crash-landed near Upwood following an engine fire on take-off.
1953
12 March 1953 RF531 of the Central Gunnery School was shot down by a Soviet fighter at Boizenberg in the Soviet Zone of Germany, seven killed.
17 December 1953 RF349 of No. 49 Squadron RAF stalled on take-off at Eastleigh, Kenya and landing gear collapsed.
1954
20 January 1954 RF335 of No. 100 Squadron RAF landing gear collapsed on take off at Eastleigh, Kenya.
22 March 1954 RE297 of No. 61 Squadron RAF flew into high ground in Kenya, five killed.
1955
9 April 1955 A73-64 of No. 10 Squadron RAAF crashed approximately 50m below the summit of Mount Superbus, west of Brisbane, Australia, while on a medical evacuation flight for a critically ill two-day-old baby girl from Townsville to Brisbane. Four crew, the baby and a nurse were killed. The aircraft was off course at night in bad weather.
26 June 1955 WD131 of No. 199 Squadron RAF collided with a USAF F-86D over Germany, six killed.
9 August 1955 RF574 of No. 83 Squadron RAF the landing gear was retracted instead of flaps during landing at RAF Hemswell.
1956
7 May 1956 RA673 of the Bomber Command Bombing School was damaged beyond repair when it hit the sea wall on approach to RAF Thorney Island.
28 September 1956 RA657 of No. 199 Squadron RAF bounced on landing at RAF Turnhouse, Scotland and ended up in a ditch.
1957
20 December 1957 RF557 of No. 199 Squadron RAF was damaged beyond repair on landing at RAF Hemswell.
1958
13 November 1958 SX934 of the Royal Air Force Flying College, landing gear collapsed on landing at RAF Manby.

1960s
1961
22 March 1961 WD144 of the Royal Air Force Flying College landed with wheels up at RAF Manby.

References

Notes

Bibliography

Avro Lincoln
Accidents and incidents involving military aircraft